Discosphaerina is a genus of fungi in the family Hyponectriaceae.

Species
As accepted by Species Fungorum;

Discosphaerina asperulae 
Discosphaerina circumtegens 
Discosphaerina cytisi 
Discosphaerina diapensiae 
Discosphaerina discophora 
Discosphaerina gentianae 
Discosphaerina graminis 
Discosphaerina himalayensis 
Discosphaerina insularis 
Discosphaerina lini 
Discosphaerina lonicerae 
Discosphaerina mirabilis 
Discosphaerina niesslii 
Discosphaerina nothofaginea 
Discosphaerina scabiosae 
Discosphaerina seriata 
Discosphaerina serratulae 
Discosphaerina sorbi 
Discosphaerina stromatica 
Discosphaerina umbelliferarum 
Discosphaerina vincetoxici 

Former species;
 D. boltoniae  = Columnosphaeria boltoniae, Phyllostictaceae
 D. bulgarica  = Guignardia bulgarica, Phyllostictaceae
 D. dioscoreae  = Phyllosticta dioscoreae, Phyllostictaceae
 D. empetri  = Physalospora empetri, Hyponectriaceae
 D. epilobii  = Guignardia epilobii, Phyllostictaceae
 D. euganea  = Columnosphaeria euganea, Phyllostictaceae
 D. fagi  = Columnosphaeria fagi, Phyllostictaceae
 D. franconica  = Guignardia franconica, Phyllostictaceae
 D. fulvida  = Guignardia fulvida, Phyllostictaceae
 D. latemarensis  = Guignardia latemarensis, Phyllostictaceae
 D. miribelii  = Guignardia miribelii, Phyllostictaceae
 D. poterii  = Guignardia poterii, Phyllostictaceae
 D. rosae  = Guignardia rosae, Phyllostictaceae
 D. tofieldiae  = Discochora tofieldiae, Phyllostictaceae
 D. xylostei  = Guignardia xylostei, Phyllostictaceae

References

External links
Index Fungorum

Xylariales